Originally produced by Minolta, the 24mm f/2.8 is compatible with cameras using the Minolta AF and Sony α lens mounts.

See also
 List of Minolta A-mount lenses

Sources
 Dyxum lens data - Minolta AF 24 F2.8 2566-110
 Dyxum lens data - Minolta AF 24 F2.8 RS 2642-110

External links
 Minolta AF 24mm F/2.8 review

24
Camera lenses introduced in 1985